Circo is a band from Puerto Rico which formed in 2001.  Its members are Jose Luis "Fofé" Abreu (vocals), Edgardo "Egui" Santiago (keyboards), José David Pérez (drums, vibes), Nicolás Cordero (bass)(Nico is no longer with the band), and Orlando Méndez (guitar). The band was nominated for Rock New Artist at the 16th Lo Nuestro Awards, losing to Mexican singer Alessandra Rosaldo. They also have been nominated for various Latin Grammy Awards in Latin Grammy Awards of 2002,Latin Grammy Awards of 2005 and Latin Grammy Awards of 2008.

Discography
No Todo lo que es Pop es Bueno (2001)
No Todo lo que es Pop es Bueno (Special 2 disc edition) (2003)
En el Cielo de tu Boca (2005)
Cursi (2007)
Adiós, Hola (2020)

See also
 Puerto Rican rock

References

External links
myspace.com/circocirco 
Pulso Rock: Bandas - Circo 

Puerto Rican musical groups
Rock en Español music groups
Musical groups established in 2001
2001 establishments in Puerto Rico